The Othersiders is an American paranormal reality television series that premiered on June 17, 2009 on Cartoon Network. The program follows a group of five teenagers who are interested in the paranormal and explore reportedly haunted sites to discover any evidence of ghosts. Aimed for a teen audience, it had a similar concept as Ghost Hunters. In June 2009, the series was a part of Cartoon Network's CN Real programming block. The second season of The Othersiders premiered on October 7, 2009 and ended on October 30, 2009.

Team members
 Riley Litman - lead investigator- the one who supplies the staff
 KC Costonis - case manager- the person who decides the place they go to
 Sam Hirsch - group webmaster- posts the videos and info they learned from them going to the place
 Zack Burke - tech manager- supplies the staff with the technology
 Jackie Zhao - researcher- the one who gets info on where they go

Series overview

Episodes

Season 1 (2009)

Season 2 (2009)

References

External links
 

2009 American television series debuts
2009 American television series endings
2000s American television series
2000s American reality television series
American fantasy television series
Cartoon Network original programming
Paranormal reality television series
Television series about ghosts
Television series about teenagers